Nemanja Tubić (born 8 April 1984) is a Serbian former professional footballer who played as a centre-back.

Career
Tubić came through the youth system of Partizan, but failed to break into the first team. He was instead loaned to Radnički Stobex during the 2002–03 season, as the club suffered relegation from the Second League of Serbia and Montenegro. In the 2004 winter transfer window, Tubić joined Čukarički. He played for four years at the club, except for six months on loan at Radnički Obrenovac (2005).

In January 2008, Tubić moved abroad and signed an initial six-month deal for Belgian side Genk, with a three-year option deal. He made six appearances for the club until the end of the 2007–08 season, before eventually returning to his homeland.

In early 2009, Tubić signed for Ukrainian club Karpaty Lviv, receiving the number 55 shirt in the process. He made 50 league appearances and scored once in two years. Subsequently, Tubić moved to Russian club Krasnodar in early 2011. He left them at the end of the 2013–14 season.

In August 2014, Tubić signed for Belarusian side BATE Borisov. He made his UEFA Champions League debut that year, as the club finished bottom of the table in Group H.

On 20 February 2018, Tubić signed for FC SKA-Khabarovsk until the end of the 2017–18 season, with SKA-Khabarovsk confirming his release on 15 May 2018.

Honours
BATE Borisov
 Belarusian Premier League: 2014

Career statistics

Notes

References

External links

 Srbijafudbal profile
 
 
 
 

Association football defenders
Belarusian Premier League players
Belgian Pro League players
Expatriate footballers in Belarus
Expatriate footballers in Belgium
Expatriate footballers in Norway
Expatriate footballers in Russia
Expatriate footballers in Saudi Arabia
Expatriate footballers in Ukraine
FC BATE Borisov players
FC Karpaty Lviv players
FC Krasnodar players
First League of Serbia and Montenegro players
FK Čukarički players
FK Haugesund players
FK Napredak Kruševac players
FK Partizan players
FK Radnički Obrenovac players
FK Radnički Klupci players
Hajer FC players
K.R.C. Genk players
FC SKA-Khabarovsk players
Russian Premier League players
Saudi Professional League players
Serbian expatriate footballers
Serbian expatriate sportspeople in Belarus
Serbian expatriate sportspeople in Belgium
Serbian expatriate sportspeople in Norway
Serbian expatriate sportspeople in Russia
Serbian expatriate sportspeople in Saudi Arabia
Serbian expatriate sportspeople in Ukraine
Serbian First League players
Serbian footballers
Serbian SuperLiga players
Footballers from Belgrade
Eliteserien players
Ukrainian Premier League players
1984 births
Living people